Eupithecia ustata is a moth in the family Geometridae. It is found in India (Sikkim, Punjab), Kashmir and China (Yunnan).

References

Moths described in 1888
ustata
Moths of Asia